Argyrodines pulchella  is a species of beetle in the family Cerambycidae. It was described by Bates in 1867.

References

Rhopalophorini
Beetles described in 1867